A granule is a large particle or grain.  It can refer to:

 Granule (cell biology), any of several submicroscopic structures, some with explicable origins, others noted only as cell type-specific features of unknown function
 Azurophilic granule, a structure characteristic of the azurophil eukaryotic cell type
 Chromaffin granule, a structure characteristic of the chromophil eukaryotic cell type.
 Astrophysics and geology:
 Granule (solar physics), a visible structure in the photosphere of the Sun arising from activity in the Sun's convective zone
 Martian spherules, spherical granules of material found on the surface of the planet Mars
 Granule (geology), a specified particle size of 2–4 millimetres (-1 to -2 on the φ scale)
 Granule, in pharmaceutical terms, small particles gathered into a larger, permanent aggregate in which the original particles can still be identified
 Granule (Oracle DBMS), a unit of contiguously allocated virtual memory
 Granular synthesis of sound

See also 
 Granularity, extent to which a material or system is composed of distinguishable particles
 Granular material, any conglomeration of discrete solid, macroscopic particles (grains)
 Granule cell, a neuron with a small cell body
 Grain (disambiguation)
 Granulation (disambiguation)
 Granulometry (disambiguation)